The Mixed Artillery Brigade is the artillery brigade of the Serbian Army with the task of providing artillery support to other Serbian Army units.

History 
The brigade was formed on June 4, 2007 from former 203rd Mixed Artillery Brigade.

Structure
The Mixed Artillery Brigade consists of artillery and rocket artillery units.

 Command Battalion - Niš
 1st Howitzer-Cannon-Artillery Battalion - Niš
 2nd Howitzer-Cannon-Artillery Battalion - Niš
 3rd Cannon-Artillery Battalion - Niš
 4th Cannon-Artillery Battalion - Niš
 Self-propelled Cannon and Howitzer Artillery Battalion - Niš
 Mixed Artillery Rocket Battalion - Niš
 69th Logistics Battalion - Niš

Equipment
Nora B-52 155mm self-propelled howitzer
Nora M-84 152mm howitzer
M-87 Orkan 262mm self-propelled multiple rocket launcher
M-77 Oganj 128mm self-propelled multiple rocket launcher
M-94 Plamen-S 128mm self-propelled multiple rocket launcher

Traditions

Anniversary
The anniversary of the unit is celebrated on September 14. On that date in 1918 with artillery bombardment of the German and Bulgarian positions started the breakthrough of Macedonian front in World War I, led by Serbian and Allied forces.

Patron saint
The unit's slava or its patron saint is Saint Marina the Great Martyr.

References

External links
Mixed Artillery Brigade Web Page

Brigades of Serbia
Military units and formations established in 2007
Artillery units and formations